Johanna Hamann Mazuré (Lima, Peru. July 21, 1954-April 7, 2017) was a Peruvian sculptor. She emerged as a contemporary artist in the early 1980s and she is known for her sculptures that explore and represent the human body through unconventional perspectives.

She became a professor at Pontifical Catholic University of Peru in 1984. Later, she became the director of studies of PCUP's Department of Art and Design and researcher of the public art of Lima.

Education 
Hamann studied at the Pontifical Catholic University of Peru (PCUP) where she received a Bachelor of Fine Arts with a mention in sculpture.

She continued her education at PCUP and received a master's degree in Humanities.

In 2011, she received her Phd in Public Space and Urban Regeneration from the University of Barcelona. Her doctoral dissertation, Monumentos Públicos y Espacios Urbanos. Lima, 1919-1930, focused on the public art in Lima and its effect on the processes of the city's development and construction.

Artworks
“Barrigas”, (1978-1983). Metal structure, plaste, resin. A sculpture of three hanging "wombs" from meat hooks. This sculpture was created in sharp contrast from the stereotype of pregnancy. Created during Peru's transition from an authoritarian dictatorship to democratic rule, her purpose of this piece was to address the violence women faced in Peru while exhibiting the harmful social expectations of motherhood

"El Cuerpo Blasonado" (1997). 
A series of life size self portraits created to depict and reflect on life, pain, and death.

 "Cuerpo I (Opresión)", (1994-1997). Wax. A life size wax sculpture of a nude woman. The figure's hands are held behind her back and her head is tilted to look up.
 "Cuerpo II (Libertad)", (1994-1997). Olive tree. This sculpture is created out of olive tree to resemble a human figure. The human arms and torso stretch into wood carved moth wings.
 "Cuerpo III (Ejecución)", (1994-1997). Wax, steel. A wax sculpture of a woman with long hair seated holding a stainless steel guillotine that cuts her thighs. The metal sheet that resembles the guillotine's blade allows viewers to faintly see their own reflection.

Exhibitions 

 "Antológica", ICPNA Miraflores: March 1-April 10, 2016
 "Radical Women: Latin American Art", 1960–1985, Hammer Museum, Los Angeles: September 15-December 31, 2017
 "Radical Women: Latin American Art", 1960–1985, Brooklyn Museum, New York: April 13-July 22, 2018
 "Cuerpo, frágil refugio", Sala Luis Miró Quesada Garland, Municipalidad de Miraflores, Lima, Perú: 2002-2003
 "El Cuerpo Blasonado Esculturas", Centro Cultural de la Municipalidad de Miraflores, Lima, Perú: 1997
 "Muestra Antológica 1983/1991", Bienal Iberoamericana de Lima Casa de Nicolás Ribera El Viejo, Municipalidad Metropolitana de Lima, Perú: 1997
 "Johanna Hamann Esculturas y Dibujos", Centro Cultural de la Municipalidad de Miraflores, Lima, Perú: 1991
 "Johanna Hamann Obra Gráfica Reciente", Galería Trilce, Lima, Perú: 1988
 "Johanna Hamann Esculturas y Dibujos", Galería Camino Brent, Lima, Perú: 1985
 "Johanna Hamann Esculturas", Galería Forum, Lima, Perú: 1983

Honors and awards 

 Teacher Appreciation Award, PUCP. 2009
 Recognition for Research, PUCP. 2012
 DAI Research Prize, PUCP. 2008

Publications 

 
 
 Lima: Espacio Público, Arte y Ciudad. 2013
 El cuerpo, un familiar desconocido. 2013
 El arte en el espacio público: interdisciplinariedad y convergencia. 2015
 Leguía, el Centenario y sus monumentos. Lima: 1919-1930. 2015

References

External links 
 "Johanna Hamann: Antológica" exhibition
 Esculturas: Johanna Hamann

1954 births
2017 deaths
Peruvian sculptors
Academic staff of the Pontifical Catholic University of Peru
Pontifical Catholic University of Peru alumni
University of Barcelona alumni